Crissiumal is a municipality in the state of Rio Grande do Sul, Brazil, with a population of 13,357 inhabitants (2020 - IBGE). It has a fluvial border with Argentina along the Uruguay River.

In sports, Crissiumal is known as "the land of goalkeepers", because it was the home of several goalkeepers, the best of them being Taffarel, who played in the Brazilian soccer team in the 1994 FIFA World Cup, in Italy.

The economy of Crissiumal is based on small rural properties.

The municipality would be partially flooded by the proposed Panambí Dam.

See also
GEMP Crissiumal
List of municipalities in Rio Grande do Sul
History of the city (text in Portuguese)

References

Municipalities in Rio Grande do Sul